Qaleh Kak (also Romanized as Qal‘eh Kaḵ; also known as Qal‘eh Gak and Ghal’eh Kek) is a village in Gol Banu Rural District, Pain Jam District, Torbat-e Jam County, Razavi Khorasan Province, Iran. At the 2006 census, its population was 2,497, in 454 families.

References 

Populated places in Torbat-e Jam County